Parerupa africana is a moth in the family Crambidae. It was described by Per Olof Christopher Aurivillius in 1910. It is found in Kenya, South Africa and Tanzania.

References

Crambinae
Moths described in 1910